Tlapa de Comonfort is one of the 81 municipalities of Guerrero, in south-western Mexico. The municipal seat lies at Tlapa de Comonfort.  The municipality covers an area of 1,054 km².

As of 2005, the municipality had a total population of 65,763.

References

Municipalities of Guerrero